Fortitude meaning courage or bravery is  the ability and willingness to confront fear, pain, danger, uncertainty, or intimidation. It is one of the four cardinal virtues that Aristotle proposed. Fortitude is the most important virtue since other virtue cannot be practiced without  it.

Fortitude may also refer to:

Ships
 HMS Fortitude, any one of several Royal Navy ships and installations
 HMS Fortitude (1780), a 74-gun third rate launched in 1780
 HMS Cumberland (1807) was launched as a 74-gun third rate; in 1833 she became the prison hulk HMS Fortitude
 Fortitude (ship), a sailing ship that carried free immigrants to Australia in 1849
 ST Fortitude, an Admiralty tugboat in service from 1947 to 1962
 USS Fortitude (AMc-81), a 1941 United States Accentor-class minesweeper
 Fortitude (1780 EIC ship), a merchant vessel built in 1780 on the River Thames

Places
 Fortitude Valley, Queensland, a section of Brisbane
 Fortitude Valley railway station, located beneath the Valley Metro complex
 Electoral district of Fortitude Valley, a Legislative Assembly electorate in the state of Queensland

Art, entertainment, and media
 Fortitude (Botticelli), a 1470 painting
 Fortitude (play), a 1968 short work by Kurt Vonnegut
 Fortitude (TV series), a 2015 British drama television series
 Fortitude (King), a public artwork by artist American James King
 Patience and Fortitude, the lion sculptures flanking the entrance to the Schwarzman branch of the New York Public Library
 Fortitude (album), a 2021 album by Gojira
 Fortitude, a 2012 album by Ian Cooke 
 Fortitude: American Resilience in the Era of Outrage, a 2020 non-fiction book by Dan Crenshaw

Sports
 Fortitude Valley Diehards, an Australian rugby league football club

Other uses
 Operation Fortitude, a World War II deception operation
 United Patriots Front, otherwise known as Fortitude, an Australian populist far-right street protest movement and Facebook group

See also
 Fortitudo (disambiguation)